WKBJ-LD, virtual and UHF digital channel 20, is a low-powered Buzzr-affiliated television station licensed to Live Oak, Florida, United States. While Live Oak and Suwannee County is within the Tallahassee media market, the station instead serves the Jacksonville, Florida market, from its transmitter and tower located near the corner of Hogan and Newton Roads in the Brackridge neighborhood of Jacksonville, just off Florida State Road 115. The station is owned by the DTV America Corporation.

Digital channels 
The station's digital signal is multiplexed:

References

External links

KBJ-LD
Innovate Corp.
Buzzr affiliates
Movies! affiliates
Laff (TV network) affiliates
Low-power television stations in the United States
Television channels and stations established in 2016